James Goodwin Hall (1896-1952) was an American stockbroker, business executive, pilot and horse breeder. He served as the vice president of Graham-Paige, a car company. He was critical in the establishment of Quarter Horses as a separate breed.

Early life
James Goodwin Hall was born in 1896. He served as a pilot during World War I. He also served as a pilot under General Hoyt Vandenberg during World War II.

Career
Hall worked as a stockbroker, serving on the New York Stock Exchange. Later, he served as the vice president of Graham-Paige, a car company, where he was in charge of the Southwestern United States.

Aviation and equestrianism
Hall flew from New York to Havana, Cuba on July 21, 1931, and he surpassed Frank Hawks's flying speed record.

Hall served as the first treasurer of the American Quarter Horse Association. In this capacity, he lobbied the National Stallion Board to recognize the Quarter Horse as a separate breed in 1942. He also produced early films about Quarter Horses in the Southwest.

Personal life
Hall married Anne Valliant Burnett Tandy, the heiress of the 6666 Ranch, in 1932. They moved to Fort Worth, Texas and had a daughter, Anne Windfohr Marion. Later, he married Tamara Cecil and moved to Midland, Texas.

Death and legacy
Hall died in 1952 in New York City. He was inducted into the American Quarter Horse Hall of Fame posthumously, in 1952. He was buried at the Arlington National Cemetery.

References

External links

1896 births
1952 deaths
Businesspeople from New York City
People from Fort Worth, Texas
People from Midland, Texas
American stockbrokers
American business executives
Horse breeders
Burials at Arlington National Cemetery
20th-century American businesspeople